Wendorf may refer to:

People 
Fred Wendorf (1924–2015), Henderson-Morrison Professor emeritus of Anthropology at Southern Methodist University
James H. Wendorf,  executive director of the National Center for Learning Disabilities (NCLD)
Keith Wendorf (born 1949), Canadian-born former German curler and curling coach.
Richard Wendorf (died 1996), murder victim of Rod Ferrell
Richard Wendorf (born 1948), Art historian and Librarian

Places 
Wendorf, Mecklenburg-Vorpommern, a municipality in Germany

Other 
The Wendorf Collection, a collection of artifacts donated to the British Museum by Fred Wendorf